Elliot Martin (February 25, 1924 – May 21, 2017) was a theater producer best known for his Broadway productions of Eugene O'Neill plays.

References 

1924 births
2017 deaths
American theatre managers and producers
People from Denver